Dr. Kailash Verma is an Indian politician member of the BJP and a member of the Rajasthan Legislative Assembly representing the Bagru Vidhan Sabha constituency of Rajasthan.

References 

1985 births
Living people
Bharatiya Janata Party politicians from Rajasthan
Rajasthan MLAs 2013–2018